Zarrentin is an Amt in the Ludwigslust-Parchim district, in Mecklenburg-Vorpommern, Germany. The seat of the Amt is in Zarrentin.

The Amt Zarrentin consists of the following municipalities:
Gallin
Kogel
Lüttow-Valluhn
Vellahn
Zarrentin

Ämter in Mecklenburg-Western Pomerania